The economy of France is a highly developed social market economy with notable state participation in strategic sectors. It is the world's seventh-largest economy by nominal GDP and the tenth-largest economy by PPP, constituting around 4% of world GDP. 
France has a diversified economy, that is dominated by the service sector (which in 2017 represented  78.8% of its GDP), whilst the industrial sector accounted for 19.5% of its GDP and the primary sector accounted for the remaining 1.7%. France was in 2020 the largest Foreign Direct Investment recipient in Europe, and Europe's second largest spender in research and development. It was ranked among the 10 most innovative countries in the world by the 2020 Bloomberg Innovation Index, as well as the 15th most competitive nation globally, according to the 2019 Global Competitiveness Report (up 2 notches compared to 2018). It was the fifth-largest trading nation in the world (and second in Europe after Germany). France is also the most visited destination in the world, as well the European Union's leading agricultural power.

According to the International Monetary Fund (IMF), in 2022, France was the world's 26th country by GDP per capita with $44,747 per inhabitant. In 2021, France was listed on the United Nations's Human Development Index with a value of 0.903 (indicating very high human development) and 22nd on the Corruption Perceptions Index in 2021.

Paris is a leading global city, and has one of the largest city GDP in the world. It ranks as the first city in Europe (and 3rd worldwide) by the number of companies classified in Fortune'''s Fortune Global 500. Paris produced US$738 billion (or US$882 billion at market exchange rates) or around 1/3 of the French economy in 2018 while the economy of the Paris metropolitan area—the largest in Europe with London—generates around 1/3 of France's GDP or around $1.0 trillion. Paris has been ranked as the 2nd most attractive global city in the world in 2019 by KPMG. La Défense, Paris's Central Business District, was ranked by Ernst & Young in 2017 as the leading business district in continental Europe, and fourth in the world. The OECD is headquartered in Paris, the nation's financial capital. The other major economic centres of the country include Lyon, Toulouse (centre of the European aerospace industry), Marseille and Lille.

France's economy entered the recession of the late 2000s later and appeared to leave it earlier than most affected economies, only enduring four-quarters of contraction. However, France experienced stagnant growth between 2012 and 2014, with the economy expanding by 0% in 2012, 0.8% in 2013 and 0.2% in 2014. Growth picked up in 2015 with a growth of 0.8%. This was followed by a growth of 1.1% for 2016, a growth of 2.2% for 2017, and a growth of 2.1% for 2018. According to the French Economic Observatory, the expected growth rate for 2022 will be 1.2%.

 Corporations 

With 31 companies that are part of the world's biggest 500 companies, France was in 2020 the most represented European country in the 2020 Fortune Global 500, ahead of Germany (27 companies) and the UK (22).

As of August 2020, France was also the country that weighed the most on the Eurozone's EURO STOXX 50 (representing 36.4% of all total assets), ahead of Germany (35.2%).

Several French corporations rank amongst the largest in their industries such as AXA in insurance and Air France in air transportation. Luxury and consumer goods are particularly relevant, with L'Oreal being the world's largest cosmetic company while LVMH and Kering are the world's two largest luxury product companies. In energy and utilities, GDF-Suez and EDF are amongst the largest energy companies in the world, and Areva is a large nuclear-energy company; Veolia Environnement is the world's largest environmental services and water management company; Vinci SA, Bouygues and Eiffage are large construction companies; Michelin ranks in the top 3 tire manufacturers; JCDecaux is the world's largest outdoor advertising corporation; BNP Paribas, Credit Agricole and Société Générale rank amongst the largest in the world by assets. Capgemini and Atos are among the largest technology consulting companies.

Carrefour is the world's second-largest retail group in terms of revenue; Total is the world's fourth-largest private oil company; Lactalis is the world's largest dairy products group; Sanofi is the world's fifth-largest pharmaceutical company; Publicis is the world's third-largest advertising company; Groupe PSA is the world's 6th and Europe's 2nd largest automaker; Accor is the leading European hotel group; Alstom is one of the world's leading conglomerates in rail transport.

 Rise and decline of dirigisme 
France embarked on an ambitious and very successful program of modernization under state coordination. This program of dirigisme, mostly implemented by governments between 1944 and 1983, involved the state control of certain industries such as transportation, energy and telecommunications as well as various incentives for private corporations to merge or engage in certain projects.

The 1981 election of president François Mitterrand saw a short-lived increase in governmental control of the economy, nationalizing many industries and private banks. This form of increased dirigisme, was criticized as early as 1982. By 1983, the government decided to renounce dirigisme and start an era of rigueur ("rigor") or corporation. As a result, the government largely retreated from economic intervention; dirigisme has now essentially receded, though some of its traits remain. The French economy grew and changed under government direction and planning much more than in other European countries.

Despite being a widely liberalized economy, the government continues to play a significant role in the economy: government spending, at 56% of GDP in 2014, is the second-highest in the European Union. Labor conditions and wages are highly regulated. The government continues to own shares in corporations in several sectors, including energy production and distribution, automobiles, aerospace industry, shipbuilding, the arms industry, electronics industry, machine industry, metallurgy, fuels, chemical industry, transportation, and telecommunications.

 Government finance 

In April and May 2012, France held a presidential election in which the winner François Hollande had opposed austerity measures, promising to eliminate France's budget deficit by 2017. The new government stated that it aimed to cancel recently enacted tax cuts and exemptions for the wealthy, raising the top tax bracket rate to 75% on incomes over a million euros, restoring the retirement age to 60 with a full pension for those who have worked 42 years, restoring 60,000 jobs recently cut from public education, regulating rent increases; and building additional public housing for the poor.

In June 2012, Hollande's Socialist Party won an overall majority in the legislative elections, giving it the capability to amend the French Constitution and allowing immediate enactment of the promised reforms. French government bond interest rates fell 30% to record lows, less than 50 basis points above German government bond rates.

In July 2020, during the COVID-19 pandemic, the French government issued 10-years bonds which had negative interest rates, for the first time in its history (which means that investors buying French bonds will pay, rather than receive, interest for owning French sovereign debt).

France possesses in 2020 the fourth-largest gold reserves in the world.

 National debt 

The Government of France has run a budget deficit each year since the early 1970s. As of 2021, French government debt reached an equivalent of 118.6% of French GDP.

Under European Union rules, member states are supposed to limit their debt to 60% of output or be reducing the ratio structurally towards this ceiling, and run public deficits of no more than 3.0% of GDP.

In late 2012, credit-rating agencies warned that growing French government debt levels risked France's AAA credit rating, raising the possibility of a future credit downgrade and subsequent higher borrowing costs for the French government. In 2012 France was downgraded by ratings agencies Moody's, Standard&Poor's, and Fitch to the AA+ credit rating.

In December 2014 France's credit rating was further downgraded by Fitch (and S&P) to the AA credit rating.

 Data 

The following table shows the main economic indicators in 1980–2021 (with IMF staff estimates in 2022–2027). Inflation below 5% is in green.

 Economic sectors 

 Industry 

France was in 2019 the world's 8th largest manufacturer in terms of value added, according to the World Bank.

The leading industrial sectors in France are telecommunications (including communication satellites), aerospace and defense, ship building (naval and specialist ships), pharmaceuticals, construction and civil engineering, chemicals, textiles, and automobile production. The chemical industry is a key sector for France, helping to develop other manufacturing activities and contributing to economic growth.

Research and development spending is also high in France at 2.26% of GDP, the fourth-highest in the OECD.

Industry contributes to French exports: as of 2018, the Observatory of Economic Complexity estimates that France's largest exports "are led by Planes, Helicopters, and/or Spacecraft ($43.8B), Cars ($26B), Packaged Medicaments ($25.7B), Vehicle Parts ($16.5B), and Gas Turbines ($14.4B)."

Sophia Antipolis is the major technology hub for the economy of France.

Energy

France is the world-leading country in nuclear energy, home of global energy giants Areva, EDF and GDF Suez: nuclear power now accounts for about 78% of the country's electricity production, up from only 8% in 1973, 24% in 1980, and 75% in 1990. Nuclear waste is stored on site at reprocessing facilities.
Due to its heavy investment in nuclear power, France is the smallest emitter of carbon dioxide among the seven most industrialized countries in the world.

In 2006 electricity generated in France amounted to 548.8 TWh, of which:
428.7 TWh (78.1%) were produced by nuclear power generation
60.9 TWh (11.1%) were produced by hydroelectric power generation
52.4 TWh (9.5%) were produced by fossil-fuel power generation
21.6 TWh (3.9%) by coal power
20.9 TWh (3.8%) by natural-gas power
9.9 TWh (1.8%) by other fossil fuel generation (fuel oil and gases by-products of industry such as blast furnace gases)
6.9 TWh (1.3%) were produced by other types of power generation (essentially waste-to-energy and wind turbines)
The electricity produced by wind turbines increased from 0.596 TWh in 2004, to 0.963 TWh in 2005, and 2.15 TWh in 2006, but this still accounts only for 0.4% of the total production of electricity (as of 2006).

In November 2004, EDF (which stands for Electricité de France), the world's largest utility company and France's largest electricity provider, was floated with huge success on the French stock market. Notwithstanding, the French state still retains 70% of the capital.

Other electricity providers include Compagnie nationale du Rhône (CNR) and Endesa (through SNET).

 Agriculture 

France is the world's sixth largest agricultural producer and EU's leading agricultural power, accounting for about one-third of all agricultural land within the EU. In the early 1980s, France was the leading producer of the three principal grains of wheat, barley, and maize. Back in 1983, France produced around 24.8 million tonnes, which was a long way ahead of the United Kingdom and West Germany, the next two largest wheat producers.

Northern France is characterized by large wheat farms. Dairy products, pork, poultry, and apple production are concentrated in the western region. Beef production is located in central France, while the production of fruits, vegetables, and wine ranges from central to southern France. France is a large producer of many agricultural products and is currently expanding its forestry and fishery industries. The implementation of the Common Agricultural Policy (CAP) and the Uruguay Round of the General Agreement on Tariffs and Trade (GATT) have resulted in reforms in the agricultural sector of the economy.

As the world's second-largest agricultural exporter, France ranks just after the United States. The destination of 49% of its exports is other EU members states. France also provides agricultural exports to many poor African countries (including its former colonies) which face serious food shortages. Wheat, beef, pork, poultry, and dairy products are the principal exports.

Exports from the United States face stiff competition from domestic production, other EU member states, and third-world countries in France. US agricultural exports to France, totaling some $600 million annually, consist primarily of soybeans and soybean products, feeds and fodders, seafood, and consumer products, especially snack foods and nuts. French exports to the United States are much more high-value products such as its cheese, processed products and its wine.

The French agricultural sector receives almost €11 billion in EU subsidies. France's competitive advantage is mostly linked to the high quality and global renown of its produce, such as cheese and wine.

France produced, in 2018, 39.5 million tons of sugar beet (2nd largest producer in the world, just behind Russia), which serves to produce sugar and ethanol; 35.8 million tons of wheat (5th largest producer in the world); 12.6 million tons of maize (11th largest producer in the world); 11.2 million tons of barley (2nd largest producer in the world, only behind Russia); 7.8 million tons of potato (8th largest producer in the world); 6.2 million tons of grape (5th largest producer in the world); 4.9 million tons of rapeseed (4th largest producer in the world, behind Canada, China and India); 2.2 million tons of sugarcane; 1.7 million tons of apple (9th largest producer in the world); 1.3 million tons of triticale (4th largest producer in the world, only behind Poland, Germany and Belarus); 1.2 million tons of sunflower seed (9th largest producer in the world); 712 thousand tons of tomatoes; 660 thousand tons of linen; 615 thousand tons of dry pea; 535 thousand tons of carrot; 427 thousand tons of oats; 400 thousand tons of soy; in addition to smaller productions of other agricultural products.

 Tourism 

France is the world's most popular tourist destination with more than 83.7 million foreign tourists in 2014, ahead of Spain (58.5 million in 2006) and the United States (51.1 million in 2006). This figure excludes people staying less than 24 hours in France, such as northern Europeans crossing France on their way to Spain or Italy during the summer.

France is home to cities of much cultural interest (Paris being the foremost), beaches and seaside resorts, ski resorts, and rural regions that many enjoy for their beauty and tranquillity. France also attracts many religious pilgrims to Lourdes, a town in the Hautes-Pyrénées département, which hosts several million visitors a year.

According to figures from 2003, some popular tourist sites include (in visitors per year): Eiffel Tower (6.2 million), Louvre Museum (5.7 million), Palace of Versailles (2.8 million), Cité des Sciences et de l'Industrie (2.6 million), Musée d'Orsay (2.1 million), Arc de Triomphe (1.2 million), Centre Pompidou (1.2 million), Mont-Saint-Michel (1 million), Château de Chambord (711,000), Sainte-Chapelle (683,000), Château du Haut-Kœnigsbourg (549,000), Puy de Dôme (500,000), Musée Picasso (441,000), Carcassonne (362,000).  However, the most popular site in France is Disneyland Paris, with 9.7 million visitors in 2017

 Arms industry 

French government is French arms industry's main customer, mainly buying warships, guns, nuclear weapons and equipment

During the 2000–2015 period, France was the fourth largest weapons exporter in the world.Arms trade: One chart that shows the biggest weapons exporters of the last five years , The Independent

French manufacturers export great quantities of weaponry to Saudi Arabia, the United Arab Emirates, Brazil, Greece, India, Pakistan, Taiwan, Singapore and many others.

It was reported that in 2015, French arms sales internationally amounted to 17.4 billion U.S. dollars, more than double the figure of 2014. Vice News explained that "While the United Kingdom has lapsed somewhat in this regard, France has maintained a high-level of production of military equipment for land, air, and sea defense – an expensive approach that relies on the export of arms and technology."

 Fashion and luxury goods 

According to 2017 data compiled by Deloitte, Louis Vuitton Moet Hennessey (LVMH), a French brand, is the largest luxury company in the world by sales, selling more than twice the amount of its nearest competitor. Moreover, France also possesses 3 of the top 10 luxury goods companies by sales (LVMH, Kering SA, L'Oréal), more than any other country in the world.

Paris is considered one of the world's foremost fashion capitals, or even "the world's fashion capital".Top 10 Global Fashion Capitals , Fashion schools

The French tradition for haute couture has been estimated to start as early as the era of Louis XIV, the Sun King.

 Education 

Education in France is organized in a highly centralized manner, with many subdivisions. It is divided into the three stages of primary education (enseignement primaire), secondary education (enseignement secondaire), and higher education (enseignement supérieur).  In French higher education, the following degrees are recognized by the Bologna Process (EU recognition): Licence and Licence Professionnelle (bachelor's degrees), and the comparably named Master and Doctorat degrees.

The Programme for International Student Assessment coordinated by the OECD currently ranks the overall knowledge and skills of French 15-year-olds as 26th in the world in reading literacy,  mathematics, and science, below the OECD average of 493. France's performance in mathematics and science at the middle school level was ranked 23 in the 1995 Trends in International Math and Science Study.

Pupils can take apprenticeships to enter the labour market with the Baccalauréat Technologique. It allows pupils pursue short and technical studies (laboratory, design and applied arts, hotel and restaurant, management etc.).

Higher education in France was reshaped by the student revolts of May 1968.  During the 1960s, French public universities responded to a massive explosion in the number of students (280,000 in 1962–63 to 500,000 in 1967–68) by stuffing approximately one-third of their students into hastily developed campus annexes (roughly equivalent to American satellite campuses) which lacked decent amenities, resident professors, academic traditions, or the dignity of university status. This is why the French higher education economy performs poorly compared with other high-performing countries such as England or Australia. France also hosts various catholic universities recognized by the state, the largest one being Lille Catholic University, as well branch colleges of foreign universities. They include Baruch College, the University of London Institute in Paris, Parsons Paris School of Art and Design and the American University of Paris. Eighteen million pupils and students are in the education system, over 2.4 million of whom are in higher education.

 Transport 

Transportation in France relies on one of the densest networks in the world with 146 km of road and 6.2 km of rail lines per 100 km2. It is built as a web with Paris at its center. The highly subsidised rail transport network makes up a relatively small portion of travel, most of which is done by car. However the high-speed TGV trains make up a large proportion of long-distance travel, partially because intercity buses were prevented from operating until 2015.

With 3,220 kilometers of high-speed train lines, France boast the 2nd most expansive network in the world, only after China.

Charles de Gaulle Airport is one of the busiest airports in the world by passenger traffic. Charles de Gaulle airport is third globally in the number of destinations served, and first in the number of countries served with non-stop flights.

France also boasts a number of seaports and harbours, including Bayonne, Bordeaux, Boulogne-sur-Mer, Brest, Calais, Cherbourg-Octeville, Dunkerque, Fos-sur-Mer, La Pallice, Le Havre, Lorient, Marseille, Nantes, Nice, Paris, Port-la-Nouvelle, Port-Vendres, Roscoff, Rouen, Saint-Nazaire, Saint-Malo, Sète, Strasbourg and Toulon. There are approximately 470 airports in France and by a 2005 estimate, there are three heliports. 288 of the airports have paved runways, with the remaining 199 being unpaved. The national carrier of France is Air France, a full service global airline which flies to 20 domestic destinations and 150 international destinations in 83 countries (including Overseas France) across all 6 major continents.

 Foreign investment

According to a study conducted by Ernst & Young, France was in 2020 the largest Foreign Direct Investment recipient in Europe, ahead of the UK and Germany. 
EY attributed this as a "direct result of President Macron’s reforms of labor laws and corporate taxation, which were well received by domestic and international investors alike."

France scored 5th in the 2019 AT Kearney FDI Confidence Index, up 2 notches from its 2017 ranking.

Labour market
According to a 2011 report by the American Bureau of Labor Statistics (BLS), France's GDP per capita at purchasing power parity is similar to that of the UK, with just over US$35,000 per head. To explain why French per capita GDP is lower than that of the United States, the economist Paul Krugman stated that "French workers are roughly as productive as US workers", but that the French have a lower workforce participation rate and "when they work, they work fewer hours". According to Krugman, the difference is due to the French making "different choices about retirement and leisure".

France has long suffered a relatively high unemployment rate, even during the years when its macroeconomic performances compared favorably with other advanced economies.
French employment rates for the working age population is one of the lowest of the OECD countries: in 2020, only 64.4% of the French working age population were in employment, compared to 77% in Japan, 76.1% in Germany, 75.4% in the UK, but the French employment rate was higher than that of the US, which stood at 62.5%. This gap is due to the low employment rate for 15–24 years old: 38% in 2012, compared to 47% in the OECD.

Since his election in 2017, Emmanuel Macron has introduced several labour market reforms which proved successful in decreasing the unemployment rate before the global COVID-19 recession struck. In late 2019, the French unemployment rate, though still high compared to other developed economies, was the lowest in a decade.

During the 2000s and 2010s, classical liberal and Keynesian economists sought out different solutions to the unemployment issue in France. Keynesian economists's theories led to the introduction of the 35-hour workweek law in 1999. Between 2004 and 2008, the government attempted to combat unemployment with supply-side reforms, but was met with fierce resistance; the contrat nouvelle embauche and the contrat première embauche (which allowed more flexible contracts) were of particular concern, and both were eventually repealed. The Sarkozy government used the revenu de solidarité active (in-work benefits) to redress the negative effect of the revenu minimum d'insertion (unemployment benefits which do not depend on previous contributions, unlike normal unemployment benefits in France) on the incentive to accept even jobs which are insufficient to earn a living. Neoliberal economists attribute the low employment rate, particularly evident among young people, to high minimum wages that would prevent low productivity workers from easily entering the labour market.

A December 2012 New York Times article reported on a "floating generation" in France that formed part of the 14 million unemployed young Europeans documented by the Eurofound research agency. This floating generation was attributed to a dysfunctional system: "an elitist educational tradition that does not integrate graduates into the work force, a rigid labour market that is hard to enter for newcomers, and a tax system that makes it expensive for companies to hire full-time employees and both difficult and expensive to lay them off". In July 2013, the unemployment rate for France was 11%.

In early April 2014, employers' federations and unions negotiated an agreement with technology and consultancy employers, as employees had been experiencing an extension of their work time through smartphone communication outside of official working hours. Under a new, legally binding labour agreement, around 250,000 employees will avoid handling work-related matters during their leisure time and their employers will, in turn, refrain from engaging with staff during this time.

Every day, about 80,000 French citizens are commuting to work in neighbouring Luxembourg, making it the biggest cross-border workforce group in the whole of the European Union. They are attracted by much higher wages for the different job groups than in their own country and the lack of skilled labour in the booming Luxembourgish economy.

 External trade 

In 2018, France was the 5th largest trading nation in the world, as well as the second-largest trading nation in Europe (after Germany). Its foreign trade balance for goods had been in surplus from 1992 until 2001, reaching $25.4 billion (25.4 G$) in 1998; however, the French balance of trade was hit by the economic downturn, and went into the red in 2000, reaching a US$15bn deficit in 2003. Total trade for 1998 amounted to $730 billion, or 50% of GDP—imports plus exports of goods and services. Trade with European Union countries accounts for 60% of French trade.

In 1998, US–France trade stood at about $47 billion – goods only. According to French trade data, US exports accounted for 8.7% – about $25 billion – of France's total imports. US industrial chemicals, aircraft and engines, electronic components, telecommunications, computer software, computers and peripherals, analytical and scientific instrumentation, medical instruments and supplies, broadcasting equipment, and programming and franchising are particularly attractive to French importers.

The principal French exports to the US are aircraft and engines, beverages, electrical equipment, chemicals, cosmetics, luxury products and perfume. France is the ninth-largest trading partner of the US.

Régions economy

The economic disparity between French regions is not as high as that in other European countries such as the UK, Italy or Germany, and higher than in countries like Sweden or Denmark, or even Spain. However, Europe's wealthiest and second largest regional economy, Ile-de-France (the region surrounding Paris), has long profited from the capital city's economic hegemony.

The most important régions are Île-de-France (world's 4th and Europe 1st wealthiest and largest regional economy), Rhône-Alpes (Europe's 5th largest regional economy thanks to its services, high-technologies, chemical industries, wines, tourism), Provence-Alpes-Côte d'Azur (services, industry, tourism and wines), Nord-Pas-de-Calais (European transport hub, services, industries) and Pays de la Loire (green technologies, tourism). Regions like Alsace, which has a rich past in industry (machine tool) and currently stands as a high income service-specialized region, are very wealthy without ranking very high in absolute terms.

The rural areas are mainly in Auvergne, Limousin, and Centre-Val de Loire, and wine production accounts for a significant proportion of the economy in Aquitaine (Bordeaux (or claret)), Burgundy, and champagne produced in Champagne-Ardennes.

Departments economy and cities

 Departmental income inequalities 

In terms of income, important inequalities can be observed among the French départements.

According to the 2008 statistics of the INSEE, the Yvelines is the highest income department of the country with an average income of €4,750 per month. Hauts-de-Seine comes second, Essonne third, Paris fourth, Seine-et Marne fifth. Île-de-France is the wealthiest region in the country with an average income of €4,228 per month (and is also the wealthiest region in Europe) compared to €3,081 at the national level. Alsace comes second, Rhône-Alpes third, Picardy fourth, and Upper Normandy fifth.

The poorest parts of France are the French overseas departments, French Guiana being the poorest department with an average household income of €1,826. In Metropolitan France it is Creuse in the Limousin region which comes bottom of the list with an average household income of €1,849 per month.

 Urban income inequalities 
Huge inequalities can also be found among cities.
In the Paris metropolitan area, significant differences exist between the higher standard of living of Paris Ouest'' and lower standard of living in areas in the northern banlieues of Paris such as Seine-Saint-Denis.

For cities of over 50,000 inhabitants, Neuilly-sur-Seine, a western suburb of Paris, is the wealthiest city in France with an average household income of €5,939, and 35% earning more than €8,000 per month.
But within Paris, four arrondissements surpass wealthy Neuilly-sur-Seine in household income: the 6th, the 7th, the 8th and the 16th; the 8th "arrondissement" being the wealthiest district in France (the other three following it closely as 2nd, 3rd and 4th wealthiest ones).

Poverty 

OECD data from 2021 estimate that 8.4% of the French population lived in poverty, compared with 18% in the United States, 11.6% in Canada, 12.4% in the United Kingdom, and 9.8% in Germany.

In comparison with the average French workers, foreign workers tended to be employed in the hardest and lowest-paid jobs. They also live in poor conditions. A 1972 study found that foreign workers earned 17% less than their French counterparts, although this national average concealed the extent of inequality. Foreign workers were more likely to be men in their prime working years in the industrial areas, which generally had higher rates of pay than elsewhere.

Wealth

Overview 
In 2010, the French had an estimated wealth of US$14.0 trillion for a population of 63 million.

In terms of aggregate wealth, the French are the wealthiest Europeans, accounting for more than a quarter of wealthiest European households. Globally, the French nation ranks fourth-wealthiest.
In 2010, wealth per French adult was a little higher than $290,000, down from a pre-crisis high of $300,000 in 2007. According to this ratio, the French are the wealthiest in Europe. The tax on wealth is paid by 1.1M of people in France, the payment of this tax starts when a €1.3M of assets is reached (there is a discount on the principal residence value).
Almost every French household has at least $1,000 in assets. Proportionally, there are twice as many French with assets of over $10,000 and four times as many French with assets of over $100,000 than the world average.
The French are also among the least indebted populations in the developed world with personal debt accounting for "little more than 10% of household assets".

Millionaires 
France has the third-highest number of millionaires in Europe as of 2017. There were 1.617 million millionaire households (measured in terms of US dollars) living in France in 2017, behind the UK (2.225M) and Germany (1.637).

The wealthiest man in France is the LVMH CEO and owner Bernard Arnault, who according to Forbes briefly held the position of the richest man in the world at the end of May 2021.

See also
Economy of French Guiana, French Polynesia, Guadeloupe, Martinique, Mayotte, New Caledonia, Réunion, Saint Barthélemy, Saint Martin, Saint Pierre and Miquelon or Wallis and Futuna
List of French inventions and discoveries
Economy of Paris
Economy of Europe
Economy of the European Union

References

External links
 
National Institute of Statistics and Economic Studies – Insee
Banque de France
World Bank: France Trade Statistics
France – OECD
France profile at the CIA World Factbook
France profile at The World Bank
France Business Facts

 
France
France
France
France